Liocrobyla desmodiella is a moth of the family Gracillariidae. It is known from Japan (Hokkaidō, Honshū and Kyūshū) and the Russian Far East.

The wingspan is 6–7 mm.

The larvae feed on Desmodium caudatum, Desmodium oldhamii, Desmodium podocarpum and Lespedeza cyrtobotrya. They mine the leaves of their host plant. They create a digitate mine.

References

Gracillariinae
Moths of Japan